Rhododendron facetum (绵毛房杜鹃) is a species of flowering plant in the family Ericaceae. It is a shrub or small tree that grows to 3–7 m in height, with leathery leaves that are oblong-elliptic to obovate-elliptic, 8.5–20 by 3–6 cm in size. Flowers are red with deeper colored spots.

Etymology
Rhododendron means "rose tree", and is derived from the ancient Greek name for Nerium oleander.

Facetum means "elegant" or "fine".

Gallery

References

Sources

 "Rhododendron facetum", I. B. Balfour & Kingdon Ward, Notes Roy. Bot. Gard. Edinburgh. 10: 104. 1917.

facetum
Taxa named by Frank Kingdon-Ward
Taxa named by Isaac Bayley Balfour